Jamie Oliver's Food Revolution (retitled Jamie's American Food Revolution in the United Kingdom) is a television show on ABC from March 2010 until summer 2011. The show was produced by British chef Jamie Oliver and Ryan Seacrest, following Oliver as he attempted to reform the US school lunch programs, help American society fight obesity, and change their eating habits in order to live healthier and longer lives.

Premise
The show premiered on ABC on March 21, 2010, in the UK on Channel 4 on September 13, 2010, in Greece on Fox Life Greece in November 2010 and in Italy on Raisat Gambero Rosso Channel in January 2011. Oliver, a celebrity chef and health campaigner in the United Kingdom, used a grassroots campaign in the US to curb obesity. In the first season, his efforts were focused in Huntington, West Virginia, statistically one of the unhealthiest cities in the country. In an early trailer for the show, Oliver challenged a group of first grade schoolchildren to identify fruits and vegetables, and they were unable to do so.  The show appeared to combine the concepts from at least two of his previous TV series' campaigns in the UK: Jamie's Ministry of Food and Jamie's School Dinners.

In the second season, Oliver took his food revolution to Los Angeles, California, home to the 2nd largest public school district in the US. Much of the season revolved around the Los Angeles Unified School District board of education's refusals to allow him to film in schools and his subsequent attempts to circumvent their decisions in creative ways.

In the episode from April 12, 2011, Oliver decried the use of pink slime in US ground meat and in US school lunches. In the episode, Oliver explained what the product is and why he was repelled by it. He utilized artistic license in demonstrating the concept by immersing beef trimmings in liquid ammonia, rather than gaseous ammonia, as in the meat industry. Oliver has stated, "Everyone who is told about 'pink slime' doesn't like it in their food—school kids, soldiers, senior citizens all hate it." The American Meat Institute and Beef Products Inc. responded with a three-minute YouTube infomercial.

Reception
In 2010, Jamie Oliver's Food Revolution was nominated for the Do Something TV Show Award from the VH1 Do Something Awards for its efforts to promote healthy eating at public schools. The show also won an Emmy Award for Outstanding Reality Program.

The show was renewed for a second six episode season on September 2, 2010. The season premiered on Tuesday April 12, 2011 at 8:00 PM Eastern/7:00 PM Central. After two episodes, the show was cancelled because of poor ratings and replaced by repeats of Dancing with the Stars. ABC aired the remaining four episodes in June; because of this, episodes 3-6 aired in the United Kingdom on Channel 4 before the United States.

U.S. ratings

Season 1 (2010)

Season 2 (2011)

Awards and nominations

References

External links

 The project's web page.

American Broadcasting Company original programming
2010 American television series debuts
2011 American television series endings
2010s American reality television series
English-language television shows
Huntington, West Virginia
Primetime Emmy Award for Outstanding Reality Program winners
Health campaigns
Television shows set in West Virginia
Television shows filmed in West Virginia
Television shows filmed in Los Angeles
Television series by Ryan Seacrest Productions
Television Academy Honors winners